The State Theatre, formerly known as Loew's State Theatre, at 703 S. Broadway, is a historic movie theatre which opened in November 1921 in the Broadway Theatre District of Downtown Los Angeles.

History 
The State Theatre was designed by Charles Peter Weeks and William Day, of architectural firm Weeks & Day, in a Spanish Renaissance style.

The theatre is incorporated into a 12-story Beaux Arts style 1921 office block called the United Building, situated at the intersection of S. Broadway and 7th St. The building extends half a block along 7th St and one-third of a block along Broadway and is one of the city's largest brick-clad buildings. The theatre originally boasted two marquees with entrances on both Broadway and 7th. The 7th St entrance was closed in 1936.

The theatre's location at the intersection of Downtown Los Angeles’ two busiest retail streets of the early 1920s ensured that the theatre was a consistent money maker. At the time of the State Theatre’s opening the theatre’s projection booth was proclaimed to be the largest in the world and boasted the unique feature of a shower bath, with hot and cold water, for the projectionist. The theatre was originally equipped with a Moller organ which was replaced with a Wurlitzer organ in 1925.

The Gumm Sisters played vaudeville at the theatre in 1929, featuring a lead singer who earned the nickname “Leather Lungs” because of her ability to be heard clearly at the rear of the 125 ft deep auditorium. Vaudeville ended at the State in 1935 and the Gumm Sisters moved to Culver City to appear in experimental Technicolor musicals where “Leather Lungs” changed her name to Judy Garland.

In 1949 the theatre was taken over by United Artists and the name changed from Loew's State to the State Theatre. In 1963 the State was acquired by Metropolitan Theatres and it went on to feature many general release movies dubbed into Spanish. Metropolitan Theatres closed the State in 1997.

The auditorium space is virtually square in shape, originally seating 2,450 (current capacity 2,387). Directly above the center of the proscenium arch, occupying a small niche, is a seated Billiken figure as a good luck charm. The theatre boasts a vibrant fire/safety curtain, by Armstrong-Powers, depicting a futuristic fantasy city of onion-domed towers surrounded by planets and comet trails.

The State Theatre is currently managed by the Broadway Theatre Group, who also manage the Palace, Los Angeles, and Tower theatres in the Broadway Theatre District.

The theatre was on a long-term lease to the Universal Church of the Kingdom of God, who called it the "Cathedral of Faith", which came to an end in early 2018.  As of January 2018 the owners are seeking a new tenant.

Use as a filming location 
 Gypsy (1993)
 What's Love Got To Do With It (1993)
 Wild Bill (1995)
Filming for Wild Bill involved re-draping the proscenium arch with swags and soft decorations that remain in place as of 2011.

Partners 

 BizBash - Issues publications and e-newsletters, maintains blogs, and creates trade shows and award shows with business entertainment specialists, entertainment promoters, and advertising , public relations, marketing, and managers in the area of human resources.
 City of Los Angeles Department of Cultural Affairs - The Department serves purpose by creating and preserving high-quality arts and culture opportunities.
 FilmWorks L.A. - Is a stakeholder-led educational and awareness program centered on Los Angeles filmmaking.

References

External links 
 State Theatre Partners

Theatres in Los Angeles
1921 establishments in California
Cinemas and movie theaters in Los Angeles
Movie palaces
Buildings and structures in Downtown Los Angeles
Los Angeles Historic-Cultural Monuments
Historic district contributing properties in California
National Register of Historic Places in Los Angeles
Weeks and Day buildings